The 2011 Ligue 1 season was the 46th of the competition of the first-tier football in Senegal and the fourth professional season.  The tournament was organized by the Senegalese Football Federation.  The season began earlier on 18 December 2010 and finished on 9 September 2011.  It was the third season labelled as a "League" ("Ligue" in French).  US Ouakam won their first and recent title, and a year later would compete in the 2012 CAF Champions League.  ASC Diaraf, second place and the winner of the 2012 Senegalese Cup Casa Sport participated in the 2012 CAF Confederation Cup, it was the last time bringing a second place club, only the cup winner would participate in the following season.

The season would have feature 16 clubs and once again, the winner would be decided on the highest number of points, it was decided after the thirtieth match was finished.  Not until the next season it would reappear in that format, the first and second phase system would reappear in the next season.  The season scored a total of 368 goals.  Casa sport had the highest total of 30 goals scored and the least was CSS Richard Toll with 15.

ASC Diaraf again was the defending team of the title.

Participating clubs

 NGB ASC Niarry Tally
 ASC HLM
 AS Douanes
 ASC Jeanne d'Arc
 Dakar Université Club
 ASC Linguère
 Compagnie sucrière sénégalaise (Senegalese Sugar Company)
 ASC Touré Kunda

 ASC Diaraf
 Casa Sport
 US Ouakam
 US Gorée
 ASC Yakaar
 AS Pikine
 Guédiawaye FC
 Dahra FC

Overview
The league was contested by 16 teams.

League standings

References

Senegal
Senegal Premier League seasons